Kasdir (Arabic: القصدير or قصدير) is a municipality in Naâma Province, Algeria. It is part of the district of Mekmen Ben Amar and has a population of 1,820, which gives it 7 seats in the PMA. Its postal code is 45130 and its municipal code is 4511.

Communes of Naâma Province
Naâma Province